Ty Williams (born December 24, 1966) is an American film and television actor. Williams was born in Saginaw, Michigan, but grew up in the city of Shields in Michigan. Ty attended the Swan Valley High School, and then attended the Central Michigan University. He had moved to Los Angeles in 1998.

His father has German ancestry, and his mother has French Canadian ancestry.

Williams is an actor, stuntman, producer, and also a miscellaneous crew member. His film debut was in the film Dawn of Our Nation which was made in 2001, and then appeared on TV, then in 2004, Ty had an uncredited role as a "Trooper" in the action film sequel Starship Troopers 2: Hero of the Federation. In 2006, Ty had got signed for a role in another action sequel in Mission: Impossible III as the "Thug", the film starred Tom Cruise again as agent spy Ethan Hunt.

Filmography
Mission: Impossible III (2006) (uncredited) - Thug
The Shield (2005) (TV series) - Bad Cop (1 episode)
Clubhouse (2004) (TV series) - Marino (1 episode)
Starship Troopers 2: Hero of the Federation (2004) (V) (uncredited) - Trooper
Dawn of Our Nation (2001) (TV) - Sgt. Burt Cooper
Naked Wishes (2000) - Bartender
The Brian Benben Show (2000) (TV series) - Ted (2 episodes)
Blue Streak (1999) (uncredited) - Armer car driver
The General's Daughter (1999) (uncredited) - West point officer
Ally McBeal (1999) (TV series) - Attorney (1 episode)
The Practice (1998) (TV series) - Bailiff (1 episode)

External links
 

1966 births
Living people
American male film actors
American male television actors
Male actors from Michigan
Central Michigan University alumni
American people of German descent
American people of French-Canadian descent
People from Saginaw, Michigan
Male actors from Los Angeles